Cecile Is Dead (French: Cécile est morte!) is a 1944 French crime film directed by Maurice Tourneur and starring Albert Préjean, Santa Relli and Germaine Kerjean. It is based on the 1942 novel of the same title by Georges Simenon featuring his detective Jules Maigret.

The film's sets were designed by the art director Guy de Gastyne. The film was made by the German-controlled Continental Films.

Main cast
 Albert Préjean as Le commissaire Maigret  
 Santa Relli as Cécile  
 Germaine Kerjean as Madame Boynet  
 Luce Fabiole as Madame Petitot, la concierge  
 Liliane Maigné as Nouchi  
 André Gabriello as Lucas  
 Jean Brochard as Dandurand  
 André Reybaz as Gérard Pardon  
 Yves Deniaud as Machepied  
 Marcel Carpentier as Dr. Pierre  
 Marcel André as Le directeur de la P.J.  
 Henry Bonvallet as Le juge d'instruction  
 Charles Blavette as Monfils

References

Bibliography

External links 
 

1944 films
French crime films
1944 crime films
1940s French-language films
Films directed by Maurice Tourneur
Maigret films
1940s police procedural films
French black-and-white films
Continental Films films
1940s French films